Margaret Burton (18 March 1924 — 23 November 1984) was an English actress who appeared in roughly a dozen British films between 1964 and 1985, including in Sex and the Other Woman (1972) and Secrets of a Superstud (1976), and in the TV series The Tomorrow People.

Career
Burton trained at the Royal Manchester College of Music, and had a successful musical comedy career in the theatre, including as principal boy in pantomime at the London Palladium in 1954, and as Louella Parsons in Marilyn! the Musical at the Adelphi Theatre in 1983.  

On TV, she played Gordon's mother in the Last of the Summer Wine episode "Going to Gordon's Wedding" (1976), and appeared in four episodes of Coronation Street in 1980 as Poppy Watts.

Filmography

Film

Television

References

External links

British film actresses
1924 births
1984 deaths
20th-century British actresses
British musical theatre actresses
British stage actresses
British television actresses